Coccidiphila gerasimovi is a moth in the family Cosmopterigidae described by Aleksandr Sergeievich Danilevsky in 1950. It is found in the Mediterranean area, on the Canary Islands and from North Africa to the Near East. It has also been recorded from Sudan, Iran, Saudi Arabia and the United Arab Emirates.

Adults are on wing from early March to October. There are probably more than one generations per year.

The larvae feed on the eggs of Coccidae species, including Pseudococcus maritimus, Laccifer lacca, Leucanium prunastri and Aonidella citrina.

References

Moths described in 1950
Cosmopteriginae
Moths of Europe